is a passenger railway station in the city of Narashino, Chiba Prefecture,  Japan, operated by the private railway operator Keisei Electric Railway.

Lines
Keisei-Ōkubo Station is served by the Keisei Main Line, and is located 32.1 km from the Tokyo terminus of the Keisei Main Line at Keisei-Ueno Station.

Station layout

The station consists of two opposed side platforms connected by a level crossing.

Platforms

History
It was renamed to its present name on November 18, 1931.

Station numbering was introduced to all Keisei Line stations on 17 July 2010. Keisei-Ōkubo Station was assigned station number KS27.

Passenger statistics
In fiscal 2019, the station was used by an average of 35,157 passengers daily.

Surrounding area
 Okubo, Narashino

See also
 List of railway stations in Japan

References

External links

 Keisei Station layout 

Railway stations in Japan opened in 1926
Railway stations in Chiba Prefecture
Keisei Main Line
Narashino